{{Infobox NFL team season
| logo =
| team = Montreal Alouettes
| year = 2011
| record = 10–8
| division_place = 2nd, East
| coach = Marc Trestman
| general manager = Jim Popp
| stadium = Percival Molson Memorial Stadium
| playoffs = Lost East Semi-Final
| MOP = Anthony Calvillo
| MOC = Sean Whyte
| MOR = Seth Williams
| uniform = File:CFL MTL Jersey 2011.png
| shortnavlink = Alouettes seasons
}}
The 2011 Montreal Alouettes season was the 45th season for the team in the Canadian Football League and their 57th overall. The Alouettes finished in second place in the East Division with a 10–8 record. The Alouettes attempted to three-peat as Grey Cup champions, after winning back-to-back championships in 2009 and 2010, but lost to the Hamilton Tiger-Cats in the East Semi-Final game. The Alouettes opened their training camp at Bishop's University in Sherbrooke, Quebec on June 5.

Offseason

CFL draft
The 2011 CFL Draft took place on Sunday, May 8, 2011. The Alouettes had seven selections in the draft, including the eighth overall pick, which they used to select placekicker and punter Brody McKnight. Montreal came into draft day needing a kicker, and traded a 2012 first round pick for Sean Whyte. Because McKnight has one more year of eligibility, he will not be able to join the Alouettes until 2012. Other notables in the draft include Vaughn Martin, who was ranked as the sixth overall prospect, but his draft stock dropped immensely due to the fact that he had already been with the NFL's San Diego Chargers for two years. Should Martin choose to enter the CFL at any point in his career, the Alouettes would hold the rights to sign him.

Notable transactions

 Preseason 

 Games played with white uniforms.

Regular season
 Season Standings 

 Season Schedule 

 Games played with colour uniforms.
 Games played with white uniforms.

Roster

Coaching staff

Awards and records

Milestones
On July 15, 2011, quarterback Anthony Calvillo became the CFL's all-time passing touchdown leader with a first-quarter touchdown, passing Damon Allen's previous mark of 394 with his 395th touchdown pass, against Allen's former team, the Toronto Argonauts. The pass was completed to receiver Éric Deslauriers, who recorded his first touchdown reception since 2007.

On October 10, 2011, quarterback Anthony Calvillo became pro footballs all-time passing leader with a 50-yard touchdown pass to Jamel Richardson, also against the Toronto Argonauts.

Playoffs

Schedule

 Games played with colour uniforms.

Bracket*-Team won in Overtime.'''

East Semi-Final

References

Montreal Alouettes Season, 2011